The 2007 NCAA Division I FCS football season, the 2007 season of college football for teams in the Football Championship Subdivision (FCS), began on August 25, 2007, and concluded on December 14, 2007, in Chattanooga, Tennessee, at the 2007 NCAA Division I Football Championship Game, where the Appalachian State Mountaineers defeated the Delaware Fightin' Blue Hens to win the NCAA Division I Football Championship.

Rule changes for 2007
The clock rules adopted in the 2006 season were reversed, after coaches in all divisions disapproved of them. The attempt to reduce the time of games sought by those rules was successful, reducing the average college football game from 3 hours and 21 minutes in 2005 to 3 hours and 7 seven minutes in 2006. The reduced game time also reduced the average number of plays in a game by 13, fewer offensive yards per game by 66, and average points per game by 5.

Rules changes for the 2007 season include:
Moving the kick-off yard-line from 35 to 30, which matches the yard-line used in the National Football League, to reduce the number of touchbacks.
 Paring the 25-second play clock to 15 seconds after TV timeouts.
 Shortening teams' three allotted timeouts per half by 30 seconds each, from 1:25 to 55 seconds.
 Allowing penalties against the kicking team on kickoffs to be assessed at the end of the runback, avoiding a re-kick, also matching the NFL rule.

Other notable changes
The Atlantic 10 Conference ceased football sponsorship after the 2006 season. The A10's football sponsorship was effectively taken over by the Colonial Athletic Association, with all of the A10 football members (Delaware, Hofstra, James Madison, Maine, Massachusetts, New Hampshire, Northeastern, Richmond, Towson, William & Mary) moving to the CAA.

Conference changes

FCS team wins over FBS teams
September 1 – No. 1 (FCS) Appalachian State 34, No. 5 (FBS) Michigan 32 (Game notes)
September 1 – Nicholls State 16, Rice 14
September 8 – Northern Iowa 24, Iowa State 13
September 8 – Southern Illinois 34, Northern Illinois 31
September 15 – McNeese State 38, Louisiana-Lafayette 17
September 15 – New Hampshire 48, Marshall 35
September 22 – North Dakota State 44, Central Michigan 14
October 20 – North Dakota State 27, Minnesota 21
October 27 – Delaware 59, Navy 52

Conference standings

Conference champions

Automatic berths

Invitation

Abstains

Postseason

NCAA Division I playoff bracket
{{16TeamBracket | RD1=First RoundNovember 23 and 24Campus sites
| RD2=QuarterfinalsDecember 1Campus sites
| RD3=SemifinalsDecember 7 and 8Campus sites
| RD4=National Championship Game
December 14Finley StadiumChattanooga, Tennessee
| group1=
| group2=
| group3=
| team-width=
| RD1-seed01=
| RD1-team01=New Hampshire
| RD1-score01=35
| RD1-seed02=1
| RD1-team02=Northern Iowa*
| RD1-score02=38
| RD1-seed03=
| RD1-team03=Delaware State
| RD1-score03=7
| RD1-seed04=
| RD1-team04=Delaware*
| RD1-score04=44
| RD1-seed05=
| RD1-team05=Eastern Illinois
| RD1-score05=11
| RD1-seed06=4
| RD1-team06=Southern Illinois*
| RD1-score06=30
| RD1-seed07=
| RD1-team07=Fordham
| RD1-score07=35
| RD1-seed08=
| RD1-team08=UMass*
| RD1-score08=49
| RD1-seed09=
| RD1-team09=
| RD1-score09=44
| RD1-seed10=2
| RD1-team10=McNeese State*
| RD1-score10=15
| RD1-seed11=
| RD1-team11=James Madison
| RD1-score11=27
| RD1-seed12=
| RD1-team12=Appalachian State*
| RD1-score12=28
| RD1-seed13=
| RD1-team13=Wofford
| RD1-score13=23
| RD1-seed14=3
| RD1-team14=Montana*
| RD1-score14=22
| RD1-seed15=
| RD1-team15=
| RD1-score15=14
| RD1-seed16=
| RD1-team16=Richmond*
| RD1-score16= 31| RD2-seed01=1
| RD2-team01=Northern Iowa*
| RD2-score01=27
| RD2-seed02=
| RD2-team02=Delaware| RD2-score02=39| RD2-seed03=4| RD2-team03=Southern Illinois*
| RD2-score03=34| RD2-seed04=
| RD2-team04=UMass
| RD2-score04=27
| RD2-seed05=
| RD2-team05=Eastern Washington
| RD2-score05=35
| RD2-seed06=
| RD2-team06=Appalachian State*
| RD2-score06=38| RD2-seed07=
| RD2-team07=Wofford*
| RD2-score07=10
| RD2-seed08=
| RD2-team08=Richmond| RD2-score08=21| RD3-seed01=
| RD3-team01=Delaware| RD3-score01=20| RD3-seed02=4
| RD3-team02=Southern Illinois*
| RD3-score02=17
| RD3-seed03=
| RD3-team03=Appalachian State*
| RD3-score03=55| RD3-seed04=
| RD3-team04=Richmond
| RD3-score04=35
| RD4-seed01= 12
| RD4-team01=Delaware
| RD4-score01=21
| RD4-seed02= 5
| RD4-team02=Appalachian State*
| RD4-score02=49'}}
* Host institution''

SWAC Championship Game

Gridiron Classic

The Gridiron Classic is an annual game between the champions of the Northeast Conference and the Pioneer Football League that has been held since December 2006.

Final poll standings

Standings are from The Sports Network final 2007 poll.

See also

Historic games
2007 Appalachian State vs. Michigan football game — first win ever by an FCS team over a ranked FBS team
2007 Weber State vs. Portland State football game — the two teams combined for 141 points, setting an NCAA all-division record for most points scored in a game

References

External links